60 Squadron or 60th Squadron may refer to:

 Aviation squadrons 
No. 60 Squadron RAF, a unit of the Royal Air Force
No. 60 Squadron RAAF, a unit of the Royal Australian Air Force
60 Squadron SAAF, a unit of the South African Air Force